Carmen L. Browne (March 29, 1895 – April 11, 1992) was an early twentieth century author and illustrator, particularly of children's books.

Early life and education 
Browne was born on March 29, 1895, in Calumet, Michigan. She attended the School of the Art Institute of Chicago and the Art Students League of New York.

Career 

Browne created illustrations for books and greeting cards for the P. F. Volland Company. Her illustrations were described as "light and dainty", "difficult to surpass in sheer loveliness", "apt pictures .. to please the wee ones",  "assisting the text admirably, designed as they are to delight the child's heart," and as making "appropriate" gift books for "little friends and relatives. She also designed wallpaper patterns for children, and invented an educational doll apparatus, "to associate with a doll educational matter which is commonly presented in unattractive, formal lessons." Her lithographs, some of which were shown at the Ninth International Print Makers' Exhibition in 1928, were described as "amusing and very expert".

A 1927 New York Times review of a group show at the National Art Club described a Browne image of a girl pulling weeds as being "as true to nature as Millet tried to make his peasant girls," and a Browne nude as, "a fine abstraction" that "removes all superfluous details and gives a chance for beautiful rhythm of movement."

Personal life 
Browne married Jesse Augustus Luckner (1891-1975) in 1945.

Death
Browne died on April 11, 1992, in Chapel Hill, North Carolina.

Selected works 
Miller, Olive Beaupré, and Carmen L. Brown. Sunny Rhymes for Happy Children. New York: P. F. Volland Co, 1917. 
Miller, Olive Beaupré, and Carmen L. Brown. Come Play with Me. Joliet, Illinois: P. F. Volland Company, 1918. 
Haynes, Louise Marshall, and Carmen Browne. Over the Rainbow Bridge. Chicago: P. F. Volland Company, 1920. 
Browne, Carmen. My Book of Pets. Chicago: Volland Company, 1923. 
Browne, Carmen. A Day of Play. Joliet, Illinois: Published by P.F. Volland Company, 1923. 
Kilner, Colleen Browne, and Carmen L. Browne. La-La Man In Music-Land. Boston: Lothrop, Lee & Shepard, 1927. 
Luckner, Carmen Browne, Matthew Ware and Ronald H. Bayes. A gift of light. Laurinburg, N.C.: St. Andrews Press, 1993.

References

American women illustrators
1895 births
1992 deaths
School of the Art Institute of Chicago alumni
Art Students League of New York alumni
American children's book illustrators
20th-century American women artists
People from Calumet, Michigan
Artists from Michigan